Glenn Daniel Rogstad Walker (born 17 June 1998) is a Norwegian professional footballer who plays as a defender.

He played youth football for Stjørdals-Blink and Rosenborg. Done with his junior years, he joined the city's number two team Ranheim ahead of the 2018 season. Facing scarce first-team action, he was loaned to his childhood club Stjørdals-Blink in the summer transfer window of 2018.

References

1998 births
Living people
People from Stjørdal
Norwegian footballers
Ranheim Fotball players
Eliteserien players
Association football defenders
IL Stjørdals-Blink players
Rosenborg BK players
IL Hødd players
Sportspeople from Trøndelag